Film and Television Institute of Hyderabad (FTIH) is a Media Training Institute in Hyderabad, India. It was in the form of impart multimedia education from 2007–2010 but later by the decision of board members it was changed to Film and television institute of Hyderabad.

Courses
FTIH offers two types of course: professional and technical. Professional courses include film technology and direction, cinematography and photography, dubbing and sound engineering and acting. Technical courses are in multimedia, including graphic design, web design, editing, composition and VFX.

See also
 Cinema of India
 Film and Television Institute of India
 Government Film and Television Institute
 State Institute of Film and Television
 Satyajit Ray Film and Television Institute

References

Film schools in India
High schools and secondary schools in Hyderabad, India
Educational institutions in India with year of establishment missing